Ghost Story is a 1981 American supernatural horror film directed by John Irvin and starring Fred Astaire, Melvyn Douglas, Douglas Fairbanks Jr., John Houseman, Craig Wasson, and Alice Krige. Based on the 1979 novel of the same name by Peter Straub, it follows a group of elderly businessmen in New England who gather to recount their involvement in a woman's death decades prior when one of them suspects her ghost has been haunting him.

Ghost Story was the final film for Astaire and Fairbanks, and the final completed film for Douglas (he died four months before the film's release), and the first film to feature Michael O'Neill. The film was shot in Woodstock, Vermont; Saratoga Springs, New York; and at Stetson University in DeLand, Florida. Ghost Story was released in the United States on December 18, 1981.

Plot
In a small New England town during the frigid winter season of 1979, four elderly friends—businessman Ricky Hawthorne, lawyer Sears James, Dr. John Jaffrey, and Mayor Edward Charles Wanderley—form the Chowder Society, an informal men's club who get together each week to share tales of horror. Edward's son David, living in New York City, falls from his apartment window after seeing a girl he's been sleeping with suddenly turn into a living corpse. His other son, Don, comes home at Edward's request. Some time after David's funeral, Edward sees him walking through town during a snowstorm and follows him to a bridge, where he disappears. Calling out to his dead son, Edward suddenly sees a female apparition and he falls to his death from the bridge. Meanwhile, two escaped patients from a mental asylum, Gregory and Fenny Bate, have taken up residence in the old Eva Galli house, now in ruins.

Doubting his father committed suicide, Don approaches the remaining three friends and tells them a "ghost" story to gain membership into the Chowder Society. In a flashback, Don tells the story of how he, a college professor in Florida, began a torrid affair with a mysterious secretary named Alma, soon becoming engaged. Alma insisted she wanted to marry Don in his home town of Milburn, but he was reluctant, as he considered the town boring. Don soon began to suspect that something was wrong with Alma, a gut feeling that was vindicated one night when he touched her and realized she was as cold as a corpse. Don eventually broke things off with a furious Alma, who disappeared from his life. He fell into a depression, costing him both his reputation and his job. A month later, Don called David in New York and learned to his horror that he had become engaged to Alma. Don desperately tried to warn David about her, but his brother scoffed at the warning. The elderly friends react to Don's story; Sears remains very skeptical. Don then shows the three elders an old photograph he's found among his father's possessions. In it there is a striking young woman who is a dead ringer for Alma. Jaffrey, realizing what has happened, pleads with his friends to tell the truth, but is rebuffed.

The next day, Jaffrey has a nightmare about Alma and dies of a heart attack. Sears and Ricky finally explain to Don that, in the spring of 1929, the four friends became smitten with a young flirtatious girl named Eva Galli. Edward first took her to bed, but he was impotent with her. Outside her house, the other three friends serenaded Eva in hopes of catching a glimpse of her when a shirtless Edward came to the window instead, giving the impression that he'd slept with her. Edward left with his friends. The four became very drunk, discussing Eva's prowess in the bedroom. They return to the house, where all but Sears danced with her. When it was proposed that they leave, Sears suggestively insisted on getting his dance, to which Eva pointedly responded that she intended to dance with all of them. Eva confronted Edward about what he had told his friends, then began to tell them the truth when young Edward leapt to silence her, knocking her down and accidentally smashing her head into the stone fireplace. Horrified, the young men believed the unresponsive Eva to be dead. They considered calling the police, but realized it would only mean ruining their lives. Instead, they load Eva's body into her car and pushed it into a nearby pond. As the car descended, Eva stirred inside, looking out at them from the back window, screaming and hammering at the glass as the car sank.

Back in the present, Ricky and Sears reveal that the Chowder Society never talked about it again, not even with each other. Due to Eva's reputation, the townsfolk were relieved when she'd gone missing and assumed that she'd simply skipped town. However, they admit that her death has haunted them all these years. Whereas Sears is dubious, both Ricky and Don believe that Alma and Eva are the same woman and that her ghost has returned to seek revenge. Don suggests they go to Eva's old house to confront the past and her ghost once and for all. They go there, but Don falls on the rotting stairs and breaks his leg. Sears leaves in his car to seek help, leaving Don and Ricky behind. While driving through the snowstorm, Sears comes upon Eva's apparition. He slams on the brakes and swerves to the side of the road. He survives, but is attacked and killed by Fenny Bate, one of Eva's accomplices. Ricky realizes something's happened to Sears and leaves to get help. He's picked up by Gregory Bate, who tells him of Eva's plans for them both, but Ricky stabs him and escapes, telling the authorities to pull Eva's car up from the lake to reveal her body inside. This is intercut with Don, who confronts the rotting specter of Alma/Eva. Ricky and the authorities drag out the ancient car and wrench open the rusted, corroded door. The rotting corpse of Eva lunges into view and falls harmlessly to the ground. Now that the truth about Eva is known, Don is spared from her vengeance, and the town is restored to peace.

Cast

Production

Conception
Universal Pictures had purchased the rights to Peter Straub's novel, Ghost Story, in 1978 for $225,000. English director John Irvin was asked to direct the film by producer Burt Weissbourd on the basis of his direction of Haunted: The Ferryman, a British television film. Upon reading Straub's novel and Lawrence D. Cohen's screenplay, Irvin envisioned the narrative as being about hypocrisy and principally "men's fear of women, and at some point, hatred." Irvin, who was a newcomer in Hollywood, hired several British filmmakers as part of his team, and stated that the film's cinematography was intended to be "European" in appearance,> and to "look like a Christmas card."

Filming
Principal photography took place in Saratoga Springs, New York and Woodstock, Vermont. Interiors of the abandoned home in the film were crafted inside the former Union Station in Albany, New York, while shooting for the Florida-based scenes was completed in Deland and New Smyrna Beach, Florida; scenes set in New York City were shot on location (in Waterside Plaza). Additional photography took place at Universal Studios in Los Angeles, California. According to Irvin, the filming process was emotionally turbulent for star Fred Astaire, who confided in Irvin that he felt he was going to die or be murdered while shooting the film, and at one point considered dropping out of the production.

Release

Box office
Universal Pictures vied for a Christmastime release for the film based on its wintry setting, and had originally slated a tentative release date of December 11, 1981. Advance test screenings were held between October 9–11, 1981 in Denver, Colorado and Boston, Massachusetts. The film opened in the United States with a wide release two months later on December 18, 1981. Limited engagement screenings of the film took place on December 16. It grossed a total of $23,371,905 at the United States box office, and was the third-highest grossing horror film of 1981 and the 34th-highest grosser of the year.

Critical response
Critical reception was mixed to negative upon release. Rotten Tomatoes gave it a 29% "rotten" rating based on 31 reviews. Roger Ebert gave the film a favorable review, praising the performances and considering it an improvement on Straub's novel. In The New York Times, Vincent Canby had the opposite view, also praising the performances but feeling that the movie oversimplified Straub's story and themes. He also criticized the central mystery and revelation as "humdrum" and anticlimactic after a strong build-up. Variety agreed with Canby that the filmmakers failed to translate Straub's novel to screen, stating that there were "isolated and excellent moments separated by artful but ordinary sketches." Rex Reed of the New York Daily News similarly noted the film's cast as "wasted," and lambasted the film as a "horrible" adaptation of the source novel.

The Time Out film guide deemed it a "disastrous distillation of Peter Straub's overrated but at least tolerably coherent novel." TV Guide awarded the film two out of four stars, criticizing Cohen's screenplay, but adding: "Director John Irvin does manage to evoke some mood and atmosphere from the snowy New England setting, and the performances from the four veteran lead players are enjoyable."

In 1982, the film was nominated for a Saturn Award for Best Horror Film.

Home media
Ghost Story was released on DVD on March 25, 1998, by Image Entertainment. Universal repressed the DVD with an alternate cover art, which was released September 7, 2004. The film received its first Blu-ray release in the United States on November 24, 2015, by Scream Factory. This release featured new bonus material, including an audio commentary with director John Irvin, as well as interviews with Peter Straub, Alice Krige, Lawrence D. Cohen, Burt Weissbourd, and Bill Taylor.

See also
List of ghost films

References

Sources

External links

 
 
 
 
 
 

1981 films
1981 horror films
1980s ghost films
American ghost films
American haunted house films
American supernatural horror films
American films about revenge
Films based on American horror novels
Films based on works by Peter Straub
Films set in abandoned houses
Films set in the United States
Films shot in Florida
Films shot in Los Angeles
Films shot in New York (state)
Films shot in Vermont
Universal Pictures films
Films directed by John Irvin
Films scored by Philippe Sarde
1980s English-language films
1980s American films